Afrilobus is a genus of African araneomorph spiders in the family Orsolobidae, and was first described by C. E. Griswold & Norman I. Platnick in 1987.  it contains only three species, found only in Africa and South Africa: A. australis, A. capensis, and A. jocquei.

See also
 List of Orsolobidae species

References

Araneomorphae genera
Orsolobidae
Spiders of Africa